County Road 911 is a  road in the municipality of Bø in Nordland County, Norway.

The road branches off from County Road 820 at the village of Skålbrekka and runs south. Klakksjordveien ('Klakksjord Road', formerly known as Veg 210 'Road 210') branches off to the east and connects to the village of Klakksjorda on the northwest shore of Jørnfjorden. The road then joins County Road 901 at Veanova.

The road was paved with gravel until 2014, when it was asphalted.

References

External links
Statens vegvesen – trafikkmeldinger Fv911 (Traffic Information: County Road 911)

911
Bø, Nordland